Volkert Doeksen (born 23 January 1963) is a private equity investor and founder of AlpInvest Partners (originally NIB Capital), one of the largest private equity investments managers globally with over €40 billion of assets under management.  Today, he serves as managing partner and Chief Executive Officer of AlpInvest Partners which has offices in Amsterdam, Hong Kong and New York.

Additionally, Volkert is member of the Board of NXP Semiconductors in the Netherlands. He also serves on the Advisory Board of private equity firm Warburg Pincus.

Prior to founding AlpInvest, Doeksen was a director of Dresdner Kleinwort Benson (today Dresdner Kleinwort), managing over $3 billion of private equity investments.   From 1992 to 1994, Doeksen served as head of the bank's Benelux region, based in the firm's London office.  In 1994, he moved to New York to head up DKB's private equity investments, including U.S. leveraged buyouts, mezzanine debt and fund of funds.

Prior to Kleinwort Benson, Doeksen worked as an investment banker focusing on mergers and acquisitions for Dillon Read from 1989 through 1992.  He began his career as a financial analyst in corporate finance for Morgan Stanley International in London in 1987.

Doeksen received his M.A. in Law from Universiteit Leiden (The University of Leiden).

Other
Doeksen serves as the Chairman of the Millennium Promise Netherlands Foundation and serves on the board of directors.

He also serves on the board of the digital consultancy SparkOptimus.

Doeksen is a Dutch national and hails from the Doeksen family which controls various shipping and transportation concerns in the Netherlands.

References

Citations

General references
 
http://www.alpinvest.com/leadership/index.asp?viewType=ByRegion&d_Bio_ID=2&Section=7,1,0
 
 
http://www.efinancialnews.com/investmentbanking/fn100/content/1046694625/volkertdoeksen 
 
http://www.thedeal.com/servlet/ContentServer?pagename=TheDeal/TDDArticle/TDStandardArticle&bn=NULL&c=TDDArticle&cid=1053702577660</ref> 
 
http://www.altassets.com/news/arc/2002/nz860.php

1963 births
Living people
Private equity and venture capital investors
Dutch money managers
Dutch chief executives in the finance industry
Businesspeople from The Hague
Leiden University alumni